Multinucleate cell angiohistiocytoma is a cutaneous condition that presents as slowly growing, multiple, discrete but grouped, red to violaceous papules

See also 
 Mast cell sarcoma
 List of cutaneous conditions

References 

Dermal and subcutaneous growths